The 2003 German 500 was the fifth round of the 2003 CART season, held on May 11, 2003 on the oval track at EuroSpeedway Lausitz in Klettwitz, Brandenburg, Germany.  The race also featured the return of Alex Zanardi to a Champ Car racing cockpit, about a year and a half after he lost both his legs in a nearly fatal crash at the 2001 CART race at the track.

Qualifying results

Alex Zanardi's 13 Laps
With 13 laps remaining in the 2001 American Memorial CART race at EuroSpeedway Lausitz, Alex Zanardi spun on the warm up lane after a pit stop.  His car spun directly into the path of the car driven by Alex Tagliani.  The t-bone accident immediately amputated Zanardi's legs above his knees.  Quick work by the medical team saved his life and by 2002 he was walking on artificial legs of his own design.

For this event a 2002 Reynard Champ Car was modified to include hand controls by Mi-Jack Conquest Racing with assistance from Walker Racing, painted in the same color scheme as the car Zanardi drove in the 2001 season. Prior to the start of the race, Zanardi took to the track and completed the 13 laps to symbolically finish the 2001 race.  His fastest lap was clocked at 37.487 seconds which would have put him 5th on the grid for the 2003 race.

Zanardi would go on to return to competitive auto racing in 2004, driving a BMW in the European Touring Car Championship (which would be redubbed the World Touring Car Championship in 2005).  On August 28, 2005 he won his first race since the accident at the Oschersleben circuit in Germany.

Race
The end of the race featured a thrilling battle between Bourdais and Dominguez. Dominguez' team appealed to CART officials multiple times claiming Bourdais deserved penalties for blocking but officials sided with Bourdais. In the closest finish of the season, Bourdais edged out Dominguez at the line.

In an effort to reduce freight costs, CART mandated teams run the same aero package for both the Brands Hatch and German rounds. While most teams ran a package more suited to EuroSpeedway, Team Player's committed to running a full road course aerodynamics package for both races. Some were concerned their parts, only designed to hit 190 mph for a brief moment, would not survive the full race with sustained speeds over 210 mph for the entire race. While their parts ultimately held for the full distance, the team saw their strategy completely backfire. After Tracy lost a gearbox at Brands Hatch, the two cars were unable to draft effectively and fought poor handling. Tracy's engine also suffered misfires lowering his speed. After entering Europe with over a full race lead in the championship, Tracy would leave Europe tied with Junqueira for the championship lead with Dominguez, Bourdais, and Jourdain all within one race striking distance of the leaders.

Caution flags

Notes

 New Track Record Sébastien Bourdais 37.000 (qualifying)
 New Race Record Sébastien Bourdais 1:49:22.498
 Average Speed 170.903 mph

The race aired via same-day tape delay on CBS in the United States. Zanardi's laps were shown in their entirety at the start of the broadcast.

External links
 Zanardi completes the 2001 Lausitz race
 Full Weekend Times & Results

G
German 500